KPKK (101.1 FM) is a radio station licensed to Amargosa Valley, Nevada, United States. The station serves the Las Vegas Valley area. The station is owned by Sky Media, LLC.

History
The station went on the air as KPUP on August 2, 2000. On July 22, 2003, the station changed its call sign to the current KPKK.

On February 4, 2010, KPKK went silent due to financial reasons. Even when the station resumed transmissions, financial and technical issues continued to dog the station. It went silent again on January 24, 2012, and though it later resumed operations, it cited technical reasons for going silent in 2013 and 2015.

References

External links

PKK
Radio stations established in 2000
Talk radio stations in the United States